Osama Mohamed (born 1 October 1979), is a retired Egyptian footballer who played as a left-back. He is currently the assistant manager of Egyptian Premier League side El Entag El Harby.

References

External links

1979 births
Living people
People from Faiyum
Egyptian footballers
Association football fullbacks
Egyptian Premier League players
Egypt international footballers
Petrojet SC players
El Entag El Harby SC players